

The North Table Mountain Ecological Reserve is a nature reserve of  located three miles (5 km) north of Oroville, in Butte County, northern California. The land was acquired by the state in October, 1993.

Ecology
The reserve protects and preserves the rare Northern Basalt Flow Vernal Pools, a vernal pools habitat type that supports sensitive plants and animals that are either locally endemic, or endemic to California. The Northern Basalt Flow Vernal Pools habitat is found in only four localities within the state.

Time and erosion have split the volcanic plateau of Table Mountain into two sections, north and south. There are smaller ravines as well that support various types of trees and woodlands. The top expanse has grasslands with lichen-covered rocks. The winter/spring rains recharge the vernal pools and create waterfalls and wildflower displays.

Biota
Sensitive plant and animal species that occur on the preserve include:
Limnanthes floccosa ssp. californica  — Butte County meadowfoam
Juncus leiospermus var. leiospermus — Red Bluff dwarf rush 
Phrynosoma coronatumfrontale — California horned lizard.

Trees in the ravine habitats include native oaks, madrones, California buckeyes, and California bays.

Birds seen include golden eagle, turkey vulture and peregrine falcon, to the small canyon wren and meadowlark.

Hunting management
In 2003, the California Department of Fish and Wildlife (CDFW) added North Table Mountain Ecological Reserve to the list of reserves under Title 14, California Code of Regulations, with special regulations that prohibit horses and bicycles from entering the reserve, but allows the department to issue livestock grazing permits, and also allows deer and upland game hunting with seasonal restrictions.

Since hunting is not normally permitted on ecological reserves, the special regulations are necessary so that DFG can determine when this public use is appropriate and will cause no impacts to protected species and habitat.

See also

Vernal pool
List of California Department of Fish and Game protected areas
Natural history of the Central Valley of California

References

Further reading
North Table Mountain: All of the Beauty, Majesty and Wonder of California written by Eva Begley, 2000

External links
 DFW−Department of Fish and Wildlife: official North Table Mountain Ecological Reserve website
 DFW: Map of North Table Mountain Ecological Reserve
 DFW: Management plan for North Table Mountain Ecological Reserve
 Chicohiking.org: Hiking maps — including Phantom Falls.
 DFW−Department of Fish and Wildlife: website on all State Ecological Reserves.

Nature reserves in California
Wetlands of California
Protected areas of Butte County, California
California State Reserves
California Department of Fish and Wildlife areas
Landforms of Butte County, California
Natural history of the Central Valley (California)
Sacramento Valley
Protected areas established in 1993
1993 establishments in California